Ronald "Randy" Boudreaux is a producer and songwriter of country music.

Early life
Boudreaux grew up in [Lake Charles, LA] and early in his career, performed in honky tonks all over Louisiana and the south. He learned songwriting from Harlan Howard.

Career
Boudreaux has written more than 70 produced songs, including "Brokenheartsville" by Joe Nichols, "Goodnight Sweetheart" by David Kersh, and "Alibis" by Tracy Lawrence. He also co-wrote the song "Matthew, Mark, Luke & Earnhardt", recorded by former jockey Shane Sellers.

Awards
Boudreaux won a GMA Dove Award for Country Album of the Year in 1997 for producing Jeff Silvey's album Little Bit of Faith.

References 

American country songwriters
American male songwriters
Living people
Musicians from Louisiana
Songwriters from Louisiana
Year of birth missing (living people)